Olivia Juliette Hooker (February 12, 1915 – November 21, 2018) was an American psychologist and professor. She was one of the last known survivors of the Tulsa race massacre of 1921, and the first African-American woman to enter the U.S. Coast Guard, in February 1945. She became a SPAR (Semper Paratus Always Ready), a member of the United States Coast Guard Women's Reserve, during World War II, earning the rank of Yeoman, Second Class during her service. She served in the Coast Guard until her unit was disbanded in mid-1946; she went on to become a psychologist intern at a women's correctional facility and a clinical professor at Fordham University.

Early life and education 
One of five children, Hooker was born in Muskogee, Oklahoma, to Samuel Hooker and Anita Hooker (née Stigger). The family was living in the Greenwood District of Tulsa on May 31, 1921, when a group of white men carrying torches entered their home and began destroying their belongings, including her sister's piano and her father's record player. She and her siblings crouched under a table, hidden by a tablecloth, until the men were gone. "It was a horrifying thing for a little girl who's only six years old," she told Radio Diaries in 2018, "trying to remember to keep quiet, so they wouldn't know we were there." The attack was part of the Tulsa race riots of May 31–June 1, 1921, in which members of the Ku Klux Klan and other white residents of Tulsa destroyed the Greenwood District—also known as Black Wall Street for the concentration of Black-owned businesses in the area—killing as many as 300 people and leaving more than 10,000 homeless.

In 1997, Hooker and other survivors of the massacre founded the Tulsa Race Riot Commission, to investigate the massacre and its aftermath, and seek reparations. In 2003, she was one of the plaintiffs in a federal lawsuit filed against the state of Oklahoma and the city of Tulsa by more than 100 survivors and about 300 descendants of people who lost their lives or property in the attacks, seeking compensation due to the local governments' involvement in the massacre; the US Supreme Court dismissed the case without comment in 2005.

After the riots, her family moved to Topeka, Kansas, and then to Columbus, Ohio, where she earned her bachelor of arts in 1937 from The Ohio State University and taught third grade. While at OSU, she joined the Delta Sigma Theta sorority, where she advocated for African-American women to be admitted to the U.S. Navy. In 1947, she received her master's from the Teachers College of Columbia University, and in 1961 she received her PhD in clinical psychology from the University of Rochester, with her dissertation on the learning abilities of children with Down syndrome.

Career

U.S. Coast Guard

Hooker applied to the Women Accepted for Volunteer Emergency Service (WAVES) of the U.S. Navy, but was rejected due to her ethnicity. She entered the U.S. Coast Guard in February 1945. On March 9, 1945, she was sent to basic training for six weeks in Manhattan Beach, Brooklyn, New York. Throughout training, Hooker became a Coast Guard Women's Reserve (SPARS) and had to attend classes and pass exams. She was one of only five African-American females to first enlist in the SPARS program. After basic training, Hooker specialized in the yeoman rate and remained at boot camp for an additional nine weeks before heading to Boston where she performed administrative duties and earned the rank of Yeoman Second Class in the Coast Guard Women's Reserve. In June 1946, the SPAR program was disbanded and Hooker earned the rank of petty officer 2nd class and a Good Conduct Award.

Psychology
After receiving her master's degree from the Teachers College of Columbia University, Hooker moved upstate to work in the mental hygiene department of a women's correctional facility in Albion County. Many women in this facility were considered to have severe learning disabilities by staff. Hooker felt they were treated unfairly and re-evaluated them in hopes to help the women pursue better education and jobs after their time in the facility. She credited this success with "approaching them with an open mind." The correctional facility today continues to help women earn a degree and job experience for when they are released.

In 1963, she joined Fordham University as a senior clinical lecturer and an APA Honors psychology professor; eventually she served as an associate professor until 1985.

Hooker was one of the founders of the American Psychological Association's (APA) Division 33, Intellectual and Developmental Disabilities and was later honored by the Association for her work with children. She served as an early director of the Kennedy Child Study Center in New York City where she gave evaluations, extra help, and support/therapy to children with learning disabilities and delays.

Later life and legacy
Hooker retired at the age of 87. She joined the Coast Guard Auxiliary at age 95 and served as a auxiliarist in Yonkers, New York.

Hooker received the American Psychological Association Presidential Citation in 2011. In 2012, she was inducted into the New York State Senate Veterans' Hall of Fame.

On February 9, 2015, Kirsten Gillibrand spoke in Congress to "pay tribute" to Hooker. In the same year, the Olivia Hooker Dining Facility on the Staten Island coast guard facility was named in her honor. A training facility at the Coast Guard's headquarters in Washington, D.C. was also named after her that same year.

On May 20, 2015, President Barack Obama recognized Hooker's Coast Guard service and legacy while in attendance at the 134th Commencement of the United States Coast Guard Academy.

On November 11, 2018, Google honored her by telling her story as part of a Google Doodle for the Veterans Day holiday.

Hooker died of natural causes in her home in White Plains, New York on November 21, 2018, at the age of 103.

Tulsa Girl, by Shameen Anthanio-Williams, is a book focused on Hooker's experiences in the Tulsa Race riots.

In October 2019, it was announced that the fast response cutter  would be named in her honor. This will be the sixty-first Sentinel-class cutter, due to be delivered to the Coast Guard after 2023.

References

External links
 

1915 births
2018 deaths
American centenarians
Schoolteachers from Ohio
African-American women academics
American women academics
African-American academics
American women psychologists
20th-century American psychologists
African-American psychologists
African-American centenarians
African-American female military personnel
African-American schoolteachers
People from Muskogee, Oklahoma
People from White Plains, New York
Military personnel from Oklahoma
University of Rochester alumni
Fordham University faculty
Ohio State University alumni
Activists for African-American civil rights
SPARS personnel
Teachers College, Columbia University alumni
United States Coast Guard non-commissioned officers
Women centenarians
American women educators
Tulsa race massacre
20th-century African-American women
20th-century African-American people
21st-century African-American people
21st-century African-American women
African-American history of Westchester County, New York
United States Coast Guard auxiliarists
African-American United States Coast Guard personnel